Nikola Đorić (born 3 March 2000) is a Serbian professional footballer who plays as a centre-back for Croatian club Šibenik on loan from the Austrian club Austria Klagenfurt.

Career
Đorić is a youth product of FK Rad since the age of 10 and began his senior career with them in 2019. He shortly after joined Železničar Pančevo on loan in the Serbian third division for the first half of the 2019-20 season, before returning to Rad. For the second half of the season, he joined Sinđelić Beograd in the Serbian First League. On 15 June 2022, he transferred to the Austrian Football Bundesliga with Austria Klagenfurt.

On 23 January 2023, Đorić was loaned to Šibenik in Croatia.

Personal life
In April 2021, Đorić was taken under police custody for a drunk driving incident in Belgrade.

References

External links
 

2000 births
Living people
Footballers from Belgrade
Serbian footballers
Association football defenders
FK Rad players
FK Železničar Pančevo players
FK Sinđelić Beograd players
SK Austria Klagenfurt players
HNK Šibenik players
Serbian First League players
Serbian SuperLiga players
Austrian Football Bundesliga players
Serbian expatriate footballers
Serbian expatriate sportspeople in Austria
Expatriate footballers in Austria
Serbian expatriate sportspeople in Croatia
Expatriate footballers in Croatia